Vatakku Vasal (which means "north entrance") is the north entrance of Swamithoppe pathi. It was here Lord Vaikundar performed his Tavam. This is considered sacred by the followers of Ayyavazhi. During the Eleven-day festival in Swamithoppe, on the eight day after the Kali vettai, scene of austerity (Ekanai) of Lord Vaikundar was performed.

See also
Swamithoppepathi
Tavam of Vaikundar

Ayyavazhi mythology
Swamithope pathi